George Frederick Tarrant (7 December 1838 in Cambridge – 2 July 1870 in Cambridge) was an English professional cricketer who played first-class cricket from 1860 to 1869.  Mainly associated with Cambridge Town Club (aka Cambridgeshire), Tarrant made 71 known appearances in first-class matches.

Tarrant was a member of the second All England XI to tour Australia, travelling out on the SS Great Britain in 1863. The team played several matches in Australia before travelling to New Zealand where they played five games. They returned to Australia to complete the remainder of the 19 tour matches.

Tarrant was a right arm fast bowler who was for a time rated the second fastest bowler in England after John Jackson.  He bowled roundarm around the wicket from a "long, lively run-up".

Tarrant took 421 wickets at 11.89 with a best analysis of 10/40. He took five wickets in an innings 41 times and ten wickets in a match 16 times.

References

Sources
 

1838 births
1870 deaths
English cricketers
English cricketers of 1826 to 1863
English cricketers of 1864 to 1889
Cambridge Town Club cricketers
Players cricketers
North v South cricketers
Cambridgeshire and Yorkshire cricketers
All-England Eleven cricketers